Oligoneuriidae is a family of mayflies with a pantropical distribution. They are also known as brushlegged mayflies due to the presence of two rows of setae used for filtration on the front legs of their nymphs. Nymphs also have tufts of gills at the base of their maxillae. There are at least 68 described species in over a dozen genera.

Genera
After
 Subfamily Oligoneuriinae Ulmer, 1914
 Homoeoneuria Eaton, 1881
 Lachlania Hagen, 1868
 Oligoneuria Pictet, 1843
 Oligoneuriopsis Crass, 1947
 Spaniophlebia Eaton, 1881
 Elassoneuria Eaton 1881
 Yawari (Salles, Soares, Massariol & Faria, 2014)
 Madeconeuria (Demoulin, 1973) 
 Fittkauneuria Pescador & Edmunds, 1994
 Rianilaneuria Pescador & Peters, 2007
Subfamily Chromarcyinae Demoulin, 1953
Chromarcys Navás, 1932.
 Subfamily Incogemininae Storari et al. 2020
 Incogemina Storari et al. 2020 Crato Formation, Brazil, Early Cretaceous (Aptian)
Subfamily Colocrurinae McCafferty, 1990
 Colocrus McCafferty, 1990 Crato Formation, Brazil, Early Cretaceous (Aptian)

References

Further reading

External links

 NCBI Taxonomy Browser, Oligoneuriidae

insect families
Mayflies